The discography of Twisted Wheel, an English rock band, consists of three studio albums, one extended play (EP), and three singles.

History
Twisted Wheel was formed in February 2007 by two former members of The Children, guitarist and singer Jonny Brown and bassist Rick Lees. They were joined by drummer Adam Clarke. The band took their name from Manchester's northern soul nightclub, the Twisted Wheel, having been inspired by Oasis naming themselves after a Swindon music venue. A week later, they played their first gig at Viva indie club in Stalybridge. 

The band signed to Columbia Records in January 2008. Their first single, "She's A Weapon", was released in April 2008 to high acclaim by Radio 1's Zane Lowe, NME and Q. Their follow-up record, a five-track EP entitled You Stole The Sun, was released in July 2008.

The band's debut album, Twisted Wheel, produced by the highly acclaimed Dave Sardy, was recorded in June 2008 and released on 13 April 2009. The first single from the album, "Lucy The Castle", was released in November 2008, with the follow-up, "We Are Us", released in March 2009. In April 2010 The free download "Tell The World" was released via the band's website.

Albums

Studio albums

Extended plays

Singles

Music videos

References

Discographies of British artists